Nisekoi is an anime adaptation of the manga of the same title written and illustrated by Naoshi Komi. It aired weekly between January 11, 2014 and May 24, 2014 on MBS and a number of Japanese nationwide channels such as Tokyo MX, tvk, TV Aichi and some others, while outside Japan, it is streamed by Crunchyroll and Daisuki with subtitles in English and other languages. It ran for 20 episodes. A second season aired between April 10 and June 26, 2015.

The romantic comedy follows the misadventures of Raku Ichijo, a high school student who is the son of a yakuza leader, as he is forcibly paired with Chitoge Kirisaki, a transfer student with a conflicting personality who is the daughter of a rival gang leader, in a pretend dating relationship to quell the feud between the gangs. As Raku pines for the affections of his crush Kosaki Onodera, he learns that the girls have been carrying keys that could unlock his locket, a symbol of his past love.

The first season was animated by Shaft and directed by Naoyuki Tatsuwa, with Akiyuki Shinbo serving as chief director and series composition writer. Shaft, under the pseudonym Fuyashi Tou, co-composed the series with Shinbo. Naoki "naotyu-" Chiba and Kakeru Ishihama composed the music for the first six episodes, and Tomoki Kikuya composed the music for episodes 7 through 20. Nobuhiro Sugiyama (Shaft) designed the characters and served as chief animation director alongside Kazuya Shiotsuki (Shaft). Starting at episode 9 and continuing through the rest of the season, Shinya Nishizawa joined Sugiyama and Shiotsuki as a chief animation director. Six episodes were outsourced outside of Shaft: episodes 3, 10, and 16 to Mouse; episode 6 to Shenron Frame; episode 8 to Studio Fantasia; and episode 12 to Digital Network Animation. A 3-episode OVA series featuring most of the same staff was produced in October of 2014 with most of the same staff with the exception of the chief animation directors: all of the episodes have Nishizawa and Sugiyama; however, Shiotsuki was only involved with episode 1, and episode 3 adds Akihisa Takano (Shaft).

The second season features Shaft, Shinbo, and Kikuya returning to their respective roles; however, Tatsuwa did not return to direct the series, which ultimately fell in the hands of Yukihiro Miyamoto, who took on the role of chief episode director. Sugiyama returned as character designer and chief animation director, as did Takano from the OVA series, but Nishizawa was replaced by Masaaki Sakurai. Five episodes were outsourced outside of Shaft: episodes 3 and 10 to Mouse; episode 5 to A.P.P.P.; episode 9 to Jumondou; and episode 11 to B.S.P. A second two-episode OVA series premiered after the second season with the same staff.

Episode list

Nisekoi Season 1

Nisekoi Season 2

Theme song list

Season 1 - Nisekoi

Season 2 - Nisekoi:

Broadcast

The series is currently being aired on a number of channels in Japan. The following is a list of the TV Channels on which the episodes are currently being broadcast along with the timing and day of the week it is aired on and the date the first episode was aired on the channel. The anime is aired weekly in all of the following channels. With the exception of Terebihokkaido and TVQ Kyushu Broadcasting where it is aired on Wednesdays and Tuesdays respectively, the anime is streamed on all of the channels on Saturdays. Some of the schedule times are for after midnight, for instance, Chibaterebi's Saturday 24:30 broadcast on January 11 takes place on Sunday 12:30 am on January 12. Occasionally the stations will adjust their schedules for other programming. It is also simulcast to Crunchyroll for premium users on Saturdays 9:00am PDT.

Notes

References
 General
 Nisekoi at Crunchyroll

 Specific

External links
  
 

Lists of anime episodes